Ryzhkov may refer to:
Nikolai Ryzhkov (born 1929) – a Soviet politician
Serhiy Ryzhkov (1958–2017) – a Ukrainian constructor and ecologist
Vladimir Ryzhkov (born 1966) – a Russian liberal politician
Yevgeniy Ryzhkov (born 1985) – a Kazakhstani swimmer
Vladislav Ryzhkov (born 1990) - a Russian footballer